The "Chirping" Crickets is the debut album from the American rock and roll band the Crickets, led by Buddy Holly.  It was the group's only album released during Holly's lifetime. In 2012, it was ranked number 420 on Rolling Stone magazine's list of the 500 greatest albums of all time. It also appears in the book, 1001 Albums You Must Hear Before You Die.

The LP was released in the US in 1957, and in the UK in 1958. It was re-released by Coral in 1962 as Buddy Holly and the Crickets. After being out of print for many years, it was reissued as a remastered CD in 2004 with bonus tracks.

Track listing

Personnel 
Buddy Holly and the Crickets
 Buddy Holly – lead vocals, lead guitar, acoustic guitar on 5, backing vocals on 2
 Jerry Allison – drums, card-box percussion and backing vocals on 2
 Joe B. Mauldin – contrabass, except on 7 and 8,  backing vocals on 2
 Niki Sullivan – rhythm guitar, except on 1, 2, 5, 7, 8 and 11, backing vocals on 2, 7 and 8

Additional personnel
 Larry Welborn – contrabass on 7 and 8
 The Picks (Bill Pickering, John Pickering and Bob Lapham) - backing vocals, except on 2, 7 and 8
 Ramona and Gary Tollett – backing vocals on 7 and 8

Charts

Album

Singles

References

External links
 

Buddy Holly albums
1957 debut albums
Albums produced by Norman Petty
Coral Records albums
Brunswick Records albums
The Crickets albums